Mirosław Kowalik may refer to:
 Mirosław Kowalik (speedway rider) (b. 1969), former motorcycle speedway rider and current coach
 Mirosław Kowalik (b. 1965), Polish musician with Raz, Dwa, Trzy